Football at the 1959 Pan American Games was held in Chicago, Illinois, from August 28 to September 6, 1959. Seven teams competed in a round-robin competition with Cuba, Haiti and the hosts (United States) competing in their first Pan American Games football tournament. Argentina defended the gold medal they had won at the previous games finishing with 11 points from a possible 12 points while Brazil and the United States claimed silver and bronze respectively.

Final table

Matches

Medalists

Goalscorers

References

1959
Events at the 1959 Pan American Games
Pan American Games
1959 Pan American Games
Soccer in Chicago